Lai Pin-yu (born 2 March 1992) is a Taiwanese politician of the Democratic Progressive Party who was elected to the Legislative Yuan in 2020. She is also a cosplayer.

Education and early activism
Lai was born on 2 March 1992 in Zhonghe, Taipei County, Taiwan. She is the daughter of the Democratic Progressive Party politician Lai Chin-lin and his wife Wu Ju-ping (吳如萍), a media worker.

Lai obtained her bachelor's degree in law from National Taipei University in 2013.

During Chen Deming's 26 November 2013 visit with Chairman of Straits Exchange Foundation Lin Join-sane, more than 20 students from the Black Island Youth Front, dissatisfied with Chen's pressure on the Cross-Strait Service Trade Agreement, planned to hold a placard to protest near the foundation headquarters. They immediately clashed with the police there; Lai was surrounded alongside two other female students by ten female police officers, and was dragged by the police all the way to the headquarters before letting go. In an interview on the same day, she said that the effects of relative cheapness of Chinese labor and the easing of environmental laws will cause Taiwan's industry to stagnate the salary level of Taiwan's labor in comparison with mainland China.

Since Lai Pin-yu is an anime fan herself and also likes selfies and cosplay, she received a lot of followers on Facebook.

Lai participated in Sunflower Student Movement in 2014 where she was arrested for blocking traffic with other protesters.

Political career
Lai entered politics in September 2019 when she became a Democratic Progressive Party candidate for the Legislative Yuan in the 2020 Taiwanese legislative election. As a cosplayer, Lai was seen dressed up as Asuka Langley Soryu from the Japanese Neon Genesis Evangelion anime franchise and Sailor Mars from the Sailor Moon franchise in her campaign advertisement. On 11 January 2020, Lai won the election to become the member of Legislative Yuan representing New Taipei City Constituency XII. Similarly, in 2022, Lai cosplayed as Yor Forger from Spy × Family.

References

External links

 
 

1992 births
Living people
Cosplayers
Democratic Progressive Party Members of the Legislative Yuan
National Taipei University alumni
Taipei Members of the Legislative Yuan
Members of the 10th Legislative Yuan
21st-century Taiwanese women politicians